Azis Syamsuddin (born 31 July 1970) is an Indonesian politician who served as First Deputy Speaker of the People's Representative Council from 2019 to 2021.

Education
Syamsuddin initially studied in but he completed high school in Padang, West Sumatra. He later received a master's in finance from the University of Western Sydney in 1999, and a master's and a doctorate in law from Padjadjaran University.

Career
In 1992, he began to work for AIA Group, but after less than a year he moved to the banking industry, joining . He only stayed in the bank for around 1.5 years, before moving to practice law, joining the law firm Gani Djemat & Partners. He would eventually become a managing partner there.

Legislator
Syamsuddin ran for a legislative seat in the 2004 legislative election under Golkar, where he had been active within Golkar's office in Tulang Bawang Regency. He ran to represent Lampung's 2nd electoral district, and after being elected was assigned to the third commission of the People's Representative Council (DPR), which worked on law, human rights, and security. He became the commission's deputy-chair in his first term.

On 25 January 2016, Syamsuddin's was replaced as chair of the third commission by Bambang Soesatyo. Syamsuddin then became head of DPR's budgetary body in February 2017, until he returned to chair the third commission in June 2019. Following the resignation of Setya Novanto as speaker, Syamsuddin was initially to take up his position, but following a rejection by a majority of Golkar legislators, Syamsuddin was not made speaker.

Following the 2019 election, Syamsuddin was appointed as Deputy Speaker of DPR.

Corruption charges

On 25 September 2021, he was arrested by the Corruption Eradication Commission.

References

Living people
1970 births
Politicians from Jakarta
Members of the People's Representative Council, 2004
Members of the People's Representative Council, 2009
Members of the People's Representative Council, 2014
Members of the People's Representative Council, 2019
Trisakti University alumni
Padjadjaran University alumni
Western Sydney University alumni
Golkar politicians